is a Japanese actress from Tokyo. She has played various roles in many motion pictures, television shows and television dramas since her debut in 1974.

Career
Harada most notably portrayed Lady Kaede in Akira Kurosawa's 1985 film Ran, and further collaborated with him in his 1990 film Dreams. Harada also provided the voice for Kaguya in the 2002 anime film InuYasha the Movie: The Castle Beyond the Looking Glass.

Harada won the award for best actress at the 21st Hochi Film Award for Village of Dreams and at the 23rd Hochi Film Award for Begging for Love.

Personal life
Harada has been married to actor and singer Ryo Ishibashi since 1987 and has three children.

Filmography

Film
Lullaby of the Earth (1976)
The Youth Killer (1976)
Torakku Yarō: Totsugeki ichibanboshi (1978)The Fall of Ako Castle (1978)Ah! Nomugi Toge (1979)Aftermath of Battles Without Honor and Humanity (1979)Ran (1985) – Lady KaedeBakumatsu Seishun Graffiti: Ronin Sakamoto Ryōma (1986) – OryōTokyo: The Last Megalopolis (1988)Tsuribaka Nisshi 2 (1989)Dreams (1990)My Sons (1991)Village of Dreams (1996)Begging for Love (1998)After the Rain (1999)First Love (2000)Off-Balance (2001)Inuyasha the Movie: The Castle Beyond the Looking Glass (2002) – Kaguya (voice)Out (2002)Half a Confession (2004)Hinokio (2005)The Samurai I Loved (2005)The Uchōten Hotel (2006)Dororo (2007)Hōtai Club (2007)School Days with a Pig (2008)Leonie (2010)Isoroku (2011)Dearest (2012)The Cowards Who Looked to the Sky (2012)Helter Skelter (2012)A Samurai Chronicle (2014) – Orie TodaOur Family (2014) – Reiko WakabaIf Cats Disappeared From the World (2016)Lear on the Shore (2017)A Banana? At This Time of Night? (2018)A Hundred Flowers (2022) – Yuriko Kasai
 And So I'm at a Loss (2023)

TelevisionNaruto Hichō (1977-78)Kita no Kuni kara (1981–2002) – RyokoTaiheiki (1991) – Ano RenshiNemureru Mori (1998) – Makiko HamazakiThe Family (2007) – Yasuko ManpyōSaka no Ue no Kumo (2009–11) – Yae MasaokaNagareboshi (2010) – Kazuko OkadaOn (2016) – Taeko IshigamiMozart in the Jungle (2018) – SadakoChimudondon (2022) – Fusako ŌshiroUmeko: The Face of Female Education'' (2022) – old Tsuda Umeko / narrator

Awards

References

External links
 

1958 births
Living people
Japanese film actresses
Japanese television actresses
Actresses from Tokyo